Pär is a given name, a Scandinavian form of Peter. Notable people with the name include:

 Pär Arlbrandt (born 1982), Swedish former professional ice hockey forward
 Pär Arvidsson (born 1960), former butterfly swimmer from Sweden
 Pär Asp (born 1982), retired Swedish footballer
 Pär Bäcker (born 1982), Swedish professional ice hockey player
 Pär Aron Borg (1776–1839), Swedish pedagogue and a pioneer in the education for the blind and deaf
 Pär Boström
 Pär Cederqvist (born 1980), Swedish footballer
 Pär Djoos (born 1968), former ice hockey defenceman 
 Pär Edblom (born 1985), Swedish former ice hockey player
 Pär Edlund (born 1967), retired Swedish ice hockey player
 Pär Edwardson (born 1963), Swedish musician, songwriter and producer
 Pär Ericsson (born 1988), Swedish footballer 
 Pär Gerell (born 1982), Swedish table tennis player
 Pär Granstedt (born 1945), Swedish politician 
 Pär Götrek
 Pär Hallström (born 1947), Swedish legal writer and professor emeritus of Law 
 Pär Hansson (born 1986), Swedish football goalkeeper
 Pär Hurtig (born 1957), Swedish rower
 Pär Hållberg
 Pär Jilsén (born 1960), Swedish former handball player 
 Pär Johansson (born 1970), Swedish screenwriter, lecturer, theatre producer and theatre director
 Pär-Gunnar Jönsson (born 1963), retired badminton player from Sweden
 Pär Lagerkvist (1891–1974), Swedish author who received the Nobel Prize in Literature in 1951
 Pär Lernström (born 1980), Swedish television presenter
 Pär Lindgren (born 1952), Swedish composer and composition teacher
 Pär Lindh, founding member of the Swedish symphonic rock group Pär Lindh Project
 Pär Lindholm (born 1991), Swedish professional ice hockey centre 
 Pär Lindström (born 1970), Swedish freestyle swimmer
 Pär Lindén (born 1966), Swedish sprint canoer 
 Pär Lund (born 1972), Swedish pianist and composer
 Pär Mikaelsson (born 1970), retired ice hockey player
 Pär Millqvist
 Pär Mårts (born 1953), retired Swedish ice hockey player, retired coach of Swedish National team
 Pär Öberg
 Pär Rådström (1925–1963), Swedish writer and journalist
 Pär Axel Sahlberg (born 1954), Swedish politician
 Pär Olof Sandå (born 1965), Swedish entrepreneur, developer and stock trader
 Pär Stenbäck (born 1941), Finnish politician and debater
 Pär Styf (born 1979), retired ice hockey defenceman 
 Pär Sundström (born 1981), Swedish bassist of power metal band Sabaton
 Pär Wiksten
 Pär Zetterberg (born 1970), Swedish former football midfielder

See also 
Per
Pehr
Peter
 

Swedish masculine given names